The 2003 All-Ireland Senior Hurling Championship Final was the 116th All-Ireland Hurling Final and the culmination of the 2003 All-Ireland Senior Hurling Championship, a tournament for the top hurling counties. The match was held at Croke Park, Dublin, on 14 September 2003, between Kilkenny and Cork. Kilkenny won on a score line of 1–14 to 1–11.

Match details

MATCH RULES
70 minutes.
Replay if scores level.
Five substitutes allowed

All-Ireland Senior Hurling Championship Final
All-Ireland Senior Hurling Championship Final, 2003
All-Ireland Senior Hurling Championship Final
All-Ireland Senior Hurling Championship Finals
Cork county hurling team matches
Kilkenny GAA matches